Alexander Pym (c. 1547 – 7 January 1585) was an English landowner.

Biography
Pym's family had been landowners in Brymore in Somerset since the thirteenth century. A lawyer, he was elected to Parliament for Taunton in November 1584, but died early the next year, leaving behind his infant son John. His widow remarried to Anthony Rous.

References

1540s births
1585 deaths
Members of the Middle Temple
Members of the Parliament of England for Taunton
English MPs 1584–1585